Grannis is a city in Polk County, Arkansas, United States. The population was 554 at the 2010 census.

Near Grannis is the Boggs Springs Youth Encampment of the American Baptist Association, a retreat of Missionary Baptist churches.

Geography
Grannis is located at  (34.238884, -94.328404).

Demographics

2020 census

As of the 2020 United States census, there were 496 people, 259 households, and 184 families residing in the city.

2000 census

As of the census of 2000, there were 575 people, 210 households, and 164 families residing in the city. The racial makeup of the city was 78.78% White, 0.52% Black or African American, 4.35% Native American, 0.17% Pacific Islander, 14.09% from other races, and 2.09% from two or more races.  16.52% of the population were Hispanic or Latino of any race.

There were 210 households, out of which 37.6% had children under the age of 18 living with them, 68.1% were married couples living together, 7.6% had a female householder with no husband present, and 21.9% were non-families. 18.1% of all households were made up of individuals, and 4.8% had someone living alone who was 65 years of age or older.  The average household size was 2.74 and the average family size was 3.10.

In the city, the population was spread out, with 26.6% under the age of 18, 11.5% from 18 to 24, 26.1% from 25 to 44, 24.2% from 45 to 64, and 11.7% who were 65 years of age or older.  The median age was 32 years. For every 100 females, there were 101.0 males.  For every 100 females age 18 and over, there were 103.9 males.

The median income for a household in the city was $29,083, and the median income for a family was $30,893. Males had a median income of $22,500 versus $17,000 for females. The per capita income for the city was $14,642.  About 15.1% of families and 15.8% of the population were below the poverty line, including 22.7% of those under age 18 and 19.4% of those age 65 or over.

Education
It is in the Cossatot River School District.

Grannis, in the 1950s, was assigned to Gillham(?) schools in Sevier County. At a later point it was in the Wickes School District, which consolidated into the Cossatot River district on July 1, 2010.

References

Cities in Arkansas
Cities in Polk County, Arkansas